are a Japanese football club based in Ryūgasaki, Ibaraki Prefecture. They played in the Kantō Soccer League Division 1, the amateur league of the country, correspondent to Japan's 5th-tier league. Their team colors are grey and navy after the colors of Ryutsu Keizai University, the institution they are affiliated with as satellite team.

History
Founded in 2001 as Ryugasaki FC, they began to play in the lower levels of Ibaraki Prefecture Leagues. Despite being formed as an independent NPO, the club largely consisted of student players from Ryutsu Keizai University, and served as farm team of Ryutsu Keizai University who were at the time playing in Kanto University League and were admitted to JFL in 2005.

In 2003, the club changed its name to Club Dragons (クラブ・ドラゴンズ). In 2005 they won promotion to Kantō Soccer League Division 2, immediately championed it and since 2006 played in Kantō League D1. They were relegated twice, in 2010 and 2013, both times spending only a single season in D2.

In 2014 Dragons reached the final of Shakaijin Cup and received a spot in Regional League promotion series despite the fact they spent 2014 season in the second division of Kantō League. They finished third in the promotion tournament, and on 10 December were officially promoted to 2015 Japan Football League. Along with the promotion, the club decided to change their name to Ryutsu Keizai Dragons Ryugasaki starting from 2015.

In 2019, RKU Dragons Ryugasaki were relegated to the Japanese Regional Leagues from 2020, after a 5-year stint at JFL.

Squad
Updated to September 24th, 2022.

Honours
Kantō Soccer League Division 2
Champions (1): 2007
Japan Football League
Apertura Champions (1): 2016

References

External links
 Official Website 

Football clubs in Japan
Association football clubs established in 2001
Tourist attractions in Ibaraki Prefecture
University and college association football clubs
Sports teams in Ibaraki Prefecture
2001 establishments in Japan
Japan Football League clubs